The Forgotten Woman is a 1921 silent American melodrama film directed by Park Frame and starring Pauline Stark.

Plot 
A "water waif" named Dixie is adopted by a hateful woman and tricked into marrying the woman's son. After her new husband is arrested on their wedding night, she ends up falling for another man.

Cast 

 Pauline Starke as Dixie LaRose
 J. Frank Glendon as Julian LaRose
 Allan Forrest as Keith Demming
 Laura Winston as 'Sis' Maloney
 Roy Coulson as Joe Maloney

Production 
Reportedly, Catherine Carr was visiting the Carolinas when she happened upon a group of Southerners who lived a colorful, bohemian lifestyle along a river. Her trip inspired her to write the script for The Forgotten Woman.

References 

1921 films
1921 drama films
Melodrama films
American black-and-white films
Films directed by Park Frame
American silent feature films
1920s English-language films
1920s American films
Silent American drama films